Langenweißbach is a municipality in the district Zwickau in the state of Saxony in eastern Germany.

References 

Zwickau (district)